Jane Parker is a New Zealand employment relations academic. She is currently a full professor at Massey University.

Academic career
After completing a BA/BCom and Masters at the University of Auckland, Parker wrote a 2000 PhD titled 'Women's equality in British unions : the roles and impacts of women's group organising'  at the University of Warwick. While teaching and researching at Warwick Business School, she worked as the UK contributing editor for the European Working Conditions Observatory (EWCO) of the European Foundation for the Improvement of Living and Working Conditions (Eurofound). She returned to New Zealand in 2008 to first work at Auckland University of Technology and after that at Massey University, where she rose to full professor in 2013.

Parker has also worked with the International Labour Organization (ILO), Pacific Islands Forum Secretariat (PIFS) and the New Zealand Living Wage movement.

Jane is co-editor in chief of Labour and Industry: A journal of the Social and Economic Relations of Work; editorial board member of Human Relations; editorial advisory board member of Employee Relations; and the co-director of the Massey University People, Organisation, Work and Employment Research (MPOWER) Group. She is also an Associate Fellow of the Industrial Relations Research Unit at the University of Warwick (UK). In June 2021, she was elected at the International Labour and Employment Relations Association (ILERA) World Congress as a member of the ILERA Executive Committee.

Selected works 
 Parker, J. (2023). Europe in transition and workplace democracy: Towards a strong social Europe? Benchmarking 2023. (chapter) (forthcoming)
 Arrowsmith J. and Parker, J. (2023). Employer perspectives on the Living Wage and Minimum Wage during Covid: Evidence from New Zealand. Labour and Industry: A journal of the social and economic relations of work'’. https://www.tandfonline.com/doi/full/10.1080/10301763.2022.2160292 (article)
 Parker, J., Arrowsmith, J., Young-Hauser, A., Hodgetts, D., Carr, S., Haar, J. and Alefaio-Tugia, S. (2022). Perceptions of living wage impacts in Aotearoa New Zealand: Towards a multi-level, contextualised conceptualisation. Personnel Review. doi: https://doi.org/10.1108/PR-01-2021-0037 (article)
 Parker, J., Young-Hauser, A., Loga, P. and Paea, S. (2022). Gender and ethnic equity in Aotearoa New Zealand’s public service: where is the progress amid the pandemic? Labour and Industry: A journal of the social and economic relations of work. 32:2, 156-177, DOI: 10.1080/10301763.2022.2091198 (article)
 Hodgetts, D., Young-Hauser, A., Arrowsmith, J., Parker, J., Carr, S., Haar, J., Alefaio-Tugia, S. (2022). Deliberating upon the living wage to alleviate in work poverty: A rhetorical analysis of key stakeholder accounts. Frontiers in Psychology. (article) (forthcoming)
 Parker, J. and Alakavuklar, O. (2022). Union collective action, social movement unionism and worker freedom. International Labour Review. First published online 13 February 2022,  https://doi.org/10.1111/ilr.12356 (article)
 Parker, J. and Donnelly, N. (2022). Historical developments in the gender pay gap in Aotearoa New Zealand: A longitudinal employment relations critique. Labour History. (article) (ahead of print, https://doi.org/10.3828/jlh.2022.9)
 Arrowsmith, J., Parker, J., Young-Hauser, A., Hodgetts, D., Haar, J., Carr, S. and Tugia-Alefaio, S. (2022). Employer and Employee Perspectives on the Living Wage in New Zealand. In T. Dundon and P. Prowse (eds). The Living Wage: Advancing a Global Movement (chapter 14), Routledge. (book) (forthcoming)
 Carr, S., Haar, J., Hodgetts, D., Jones, H., Arrowsmith, J., Parker, J., Young-Hauser, A., Tugia-Alefaio, S. (2022). Pandemic or Not, Worker Wellbeing Pivots About the Living Wage Point: A Replication, Extension, and Policy Challenge in Aotearoa New Zealand. Frontiers in Psychology (article) (forthcoming)
 Parker, J., Sayers, J.S., Barnett, S., Young-Houser, A., Loga, P. and Paea, S. (2021) Gender and ethnic equity in Aotearoa New Zealand's public service before and since COVID-19: Towards intersectional inclusion? Gender, Work & Organization. (article) (early view, doi: https://doi.org/10.1111/gwao.12759)
 Parker, J., Young-Hauser, A., Sayers, J., Loga, P., Paea, S. and Barnett, S. (2021). Pragmatic evaluation of transdisciplinary research on gender equity in the New Zealand public service. Qualitative Research in Organizations and Management, early view online. (article)
 Shahbaz, W. and Parker, J. (2021). Workplace mindfulness: An integrative review of antecedents, mediators, and moderators. Human Resource Management Review, https://doi.org/10.1016/j.hrmr.2021.100849. (article) 
 Parker, J. and Donnelly, N. (2021). Gender Equality Developments in Aotearoa New Zealand: Implications for Japan?. In G. Eweje and S. Ngano (eds). Corporate Social Responsibility and Gender Equality in Japan (chapter 12). Springer Nature. (chapter) (forthcoming)
 Proctor-Thompson, S., Donnelly, N. and Parker, J. (2021). Bargaining for Gender Equality in Aotearoa  New Zealand: Flexible Work Arrangements in Collective Agreements, 2007-19. Journal of Industrial Relations, published online: https://doi.org/10.1177/00221856211025574. (article)
 O'Kane, P., Ravenswood, K., Douglas, J., Edgar, F. and Parker, J. (2021). Editorial: Special Issue – AIRAANZ 2020: Doing Things Differently: Industrial Relations practice and research beyond 2020. Labour and Industry: A journal of the social and economic relations of work (open access online). (article)
 Parker, J., Alakavuklar, O. and Huggard, S. (2021). Social Movement Unionism through Radical Democracy: The Case of the New Zealand Council of Trade Unions and climate change. Industrial Relations Journal, 52, 3: 270-285 (article)
 Carr, S.C., Young-Hauser, A., Hodgetts, D., Schmidt, W., Moran, L., Parker, J., Arrowsmith, J, Haar, J., Jones, H. and Alefaio-Tuglia, S. (2021). How Decent Wages Transform Qualities of Living – By Affording Escape from Working Poverty Traps. Journal of Sustainability Research 3, 2 (online). https://doi.org/10.20900/jsr20210012 (article)
 Shahbaz, W. and Parker, J. (2021). Workplace mindfulness: Fundamental issues for research and practice. Labour and Industry: A journal of the social and economic issues of work. DOI: 10.1080/10301763.2021.1878572 (article)
 Parker, J. and Donnelly, N. (2020) "The revival and refashioning of gender pay equity in New Zealand." Journal of Industrial Relations. Special Issue, DPI: 10.1177/0022185620929374 (article)
 Arrowsmith, J. and Parker, J. (2020) "The Political Economy of Employment Regulation in Small Developing Countries." Relations Industrielles, 75, 1: 123–152. (article)
 Parker, J. and Alakavuklar, O. (2019). "Social Movement Unionism as Union-Civil Alliances: A Democratizing Force? The New Zealand Case." Relations Industrielles, 73, 4: 784–813. (article)
 Carr, S., Haar, J., Hodgetts, D., Arrowsmith, J., Parker, J. et al. (2019). "An Employee’s Living Wage and their Quality of Work Life: How important are Household Size and Household Income?" Journal of Sustainability Research, https://sustainability.hapres.com/htmls/JSR_1041_Detail.html (article)
 Parker, J. (ed) with Baird, M. (2018) The Big Issues in Employment: HR Management and Employment Relations in Australasia. Auckland: CCH (Wolters Kluwer). (book)
 Carr, S.C., Parker, J., Arrowsmith, J. and Watters, P.A. (2016) "The living wage: Theoretical integration and an applied research agenda." International Labour Review 155, 1: 1-24. (article)
 Parker, J., Arrowsmith, J., Fells, R. and Prowse, P. (2016). "The living wage: concepts, contexts and future concerns." Labour and Industry: A journal of the social and economic relations of work: 1–7. (article)
 Parker, J. (ed.) with Arrowsmith, J. (2013) The Big Issues in Employment: HR Management and Employment Relations in New Zealand. Auckland: CCH (Wolters Kluwer). (book)
 Arrowsmith, J. and Parker, J. (2013) The meaning of 'employee engagement' for the values and the roles of the HRM function. International Journal of Human Resource Management, 24:14, 2,692-2,712. (article)
 Hall, M., Purcell, J., Terry, M., Hutchinson, S. and Parker, J. (2015) "Trade union approaches towards the ICE Regulations: defensive realism or missed opportunity?." British Journal of Industrial Relations, 53, 2: 350–375. (article)
 Holgate, J., Abbott, S., Kamenou, N., Kinge, J., Parker, J. et al. (2012). "Equality and diversity in employment relations: do we practise what we preach?." Equality, Diversity and Inclusion, 31, 4: 323–339. (article)
 Parker, J. (2002) Women's Groups in British Unions. British Journal of Industrial Relations, 40, 1: 23–48.
 Deeks, J., Parker, J. and Ryan, R. (1994) Labour and Employment Relations in New Zealand. Auckland: Longman Paul. (book)

References

External links
 
 
 

Living people
Year of birth missing (living people)
Academic staff of the Massey University
New Zealand women academics